Veliko Krčmare is a village in the municipality of Rača, Serbia. According to the 2002 census, the village has a population of 830 people.

References

Populated places in Šumadija District